Honduras competed in the 2015 Pan American Games in Toronto, Ontario, Canada from July 10 to 26, 2015.

On July 3, 2015, wrestler Kevin Mejía, was named as the country's flagbearer during the opening ceremony.

Competitors
The following table lists Honduras' delegation per sport and gender.

Medalists

The following competitors from Honduras won medals at the games. In the by discipline sections below, medalists' names are bolded.

|style="text-align:left; width:78%; vertical-align:top;"|

|style="text-align:left; width:22%; vertical-align:top;"|

Athletics

Honduras qualified one athlete.

Key
 Note – Ranks given for track events are for the entire round
 DSQ = Disqualified

Men

Boxing

Honduras qualified one male boxer. The boxer later tested positive for positive for drugs and was withdrawn from the competition.

Men

Equestrian

Honduras qualified one athlete in dressage.

Gymnastics

Honduras qualified one female gymnast. Kaisa Chirinos did not compete after injuring her thumb during training.

Artistic
Women

Qualification Legend: Q = Qualified to apparatus final

Judo

Honduras qualified one male judoka.

Men

Shooting

Honduras received one wildcard.

Women

Swimming

Honduras qualified three swimmers.

Key
Note – Ranks given are for the entire round
FB = Qualified for the B Final
DNS = Did not start

Taekwondo

Honduras qualified a team of three athletes (one man and two women).

Tennis

Honduras received one wildcard spot in the men's singles event, the country later received a reallocated men's spot.

Men

Weightlifting

Honduras qualified one male weightlifter.

Men

Wrestling

Honduras qualified four male wrestlers.

Men's

See also
Honduras at the 2016 Summer Olympics

References

Nations at the 2015 Pan American Games
P
2015